Scott Mayer (born August 31, 1964 in Franklin, Wisconsin) is a former driver in the Indy Racing League IndyCar Series. He participated in the first three races of the 2003 IndyCar Series season for PDM Racing and crashed in all three races. He then failed to complete rookie orientation for the Indy 500. He entered the 2005 Indianapolis 500 with A. J. Foyt Enterprises but again failed to complete rookie orientation. He also made four starts in the Indy Pro Series in 2004 and 2005. In 2010 he tested with Doran Racing at Putnam Park in Indiana. In 2011 he raced in the 24 Hours of Daytona for Starworks Motorsport. The team finished 44th. In 2012 he competed part-time in the Rolex Sports Car Series and finished 24th in Daytona Prototype points with a best finish of fifth at Road America. He has returned to the series in 2013.

Personal life
Mayer's son Sam also races. He won US Legend Car Winter Heat Championship, the Summer Shootout and US Legend Car Asphalt Nationals in 2017. The younger Mayer was signed to JR Motorsports as a 15 year old for 2018 season. Sam won back to back championships in the NASCAR K&N Pro Series East (2019) and ARCA Menards Series East (2020).

Racing record

IRL IndyCar Series

WeatherTech SportsCar Championship 

1 The No. 7 of Starworks Motorsport withdrew from the 12 Hours of Sebring before Practice.

References

1964 births
24 Hours of Daytona drivers
Indy Lights drivers
IndyCar Series drivers
Living people
Racing drivers from Milwaukee
Racing drivers from Wisconsin
Rolex Sports Car Series drivers
Barber Pro Series drivers
WeatherTech SportsCar Championship drivers
People from Franklin, Milwaukee County, Wisconsin

Arrow McLaren SP drivers
PDM Racing drivers
A. J. Foyt Enterprises drivers
Starworks Motorsport drivers
Cheever Racing drivers